Bruguers is a village within the municipality of Gavà in the comarca of Baix Llobregat, province of Barcelona, Catalonia, Spain. It lies halfway between the towns of Begues and Gavà.

This 13th-century Romanesque church complex contains an effigy of the Virgin Mary from the 14th century.

The GR 92 long distance footpath, which roughly follows the length of the Mediterranean coast of Spain, has a staging point at Bruguers.

Gallery

References 

Populated places in Baix Llobregat